Vinemina opacaria is a species of geometrid moth in the family Geometridae. It is found in North America.

The MONA or Hodges number for Vinemina opacaria is 6635.

References

Further reading

 

Melanolophiini
Articles created by Qbugbot
Moths described in 1881